The 2015 Harlow District Council election took place on 7 May 2015 to elect members of Harlow District Council in Essex, England. One third of the council was up for election and Labour Party councillors increased their control of the council as the governing group, gaining one councillor and suffering no losses.

Background
After the last election in 2014 Labour remained in control of the council with 17 councillors, while the Conservatives had 11 seats and the UK Independence Party had 5 seats. However Labour gained a seat from the UK Independence Party at a by-election for Mark Hall ward in February 2015.

A UKIP councillor for Great Parndon ward, Terry Spooner, resigned in March to retire to Dorset so two of its three seats were contested at the 2015 election, leading to 12 seats up for election, which were contested by 43 candidates: 12 each affiliated to Labour, the Conservatives and UKIP and seven Liberal Democrats.

Election result
Labour remained in control of the council with 19 councillors after winning 7 of the 12 seats contested. Both they and the Conservatives gained a seat at the expense of the UK Independence Party, taking the Conservatives to 12 seats on the council, while the UK Independence Party was left with two councillors. Overall turnout at the election was 62.68%.

Ward results

Bush Fair

Church Langley

Great Parndon (2 seats)

Harlow Common

Little Parndon and Hare Street

Mark Hall

Netteswell

Old Harlow

Staple Tye

Summers and Kingsmoor

Toddbrook

References

Harlow District Council elections
2015 English local elections
May 2015 events in the United Kingdom
2010s in Essex